Cyana quentini is a moth of the family Erebidae. It was described by Timm Karisch in 2003 and is endemic to the Democratic Republic of the Congo.

References

quentini
Moths described in 2003
Endemic fauna of the Democratic Republic of the Congo
Insects of the Democratic Republic of the Congo
Moths of Africa